Adolfo Nef Sanhueza (born January 18, 1946) is a former Chilean football goalkeeper, who played for the Chile national team between 1969 and 1977, gaining 42 caps. He was part of the Chile squad for the 1974 World Cup.

At club level, Nef played for Lota Schwager, Universidad de Chile, Colo-Colo, Universidad Católica and Magallanes.

References

External links
 
 

1946 births
People from Lota, Chile
Chilean footballers
Association football goalkeepers
Chile international footballers
1974 FIFA World Cup players
1975 Copa América players
Living people
Lota Schwager footballers
Colo-Colo footballers
Universidad de Chile footballers
San Luis de Quillota footballers
Magallanes footballers
Chilean people of German descent